Gerald Edward Levert (July 13, 1966 – November 10, 2006) was an American singer-songwriter and producer. Levert was best known for singing with his brother, Sean Levert, and friend Marc Gordon of the vocal group LeVert. Levert was also a member of LSG, a supergroup comprising Keith Sweat, Johnny Gill, and himself. Levert is the son of Eddie Levert, who is the lead singer of the R&B/soul vocal group the O'Jays. He released nine solo albums, six with LeVert, two with his father Eddie Levert, two with LSG, as well as discovering the R&B groups the Rude Boys, Men at Large and 1 of the Girls. Levert was also part of the R&B group Black Men United.

Early life and education
Levert was born to the frontman of the O'Jays, Eddie Levert, and his wife Martha in Dayton, Ohio, on July 13, 1966. He grew up in Shaker Heights, a suburb of Cleveland.

Due to his father's career, Levert would travel with the band regularly. While in high school, Levert's inclination towards music became apparent when he formed the trio LeVert, with his younger brother Sean Levert (September 28, 1968 – March 30, 2008) and friend Marc Gordon in 1983.

Singing career
Four of LeVert's seven albums went gold.

In 1991, Levert went solo with the albums, Private Line, which went to number one on the R&B charts. The following year, Gerald and his father, Eddie Levert, hit number one on the R&B charts with the single, Baby Hold On to Me. Levert recorded a string of albums throughout the 1990s and early 2000s, that contained the hit singles, "Thinkin' About It" (No. 12 Pop) which was released June 23, 1998, "Taking Everything" (No. 11 Pop), "Funny", "Mr. Too Damn Good to You", "U Got That Love", and a remake of R. Kelly's "I Believe I Can Fly", along with gospel singer Yolanda Adams. Levert also sang lead vocals in two songs on the 2002 film documentary "Standing in the Shadows of Motown" - the story of the Funk Brothers. Levert performed "Shotgun" and "Reach Out I'll Be There". Levert released his tenth album, Voices, in 2005.

Levert wrote and produced songs for other artists such as Patti LaBelle, Barry White, Stephanie Mills, Anita Baker, Eugene Wilde, Teddy Pendergrass, James Ingram, Freddie Jackson, Chuckii Booker, the Rude Boys, New Edition, Men at Large and 1 of the Girls. During the release of Groove On, Levert appeared in the group Black Men United for the hit single "U Will Know" for the film Jason's Lyric, the movie's soundtrack. who was participated in the group and joining with Keith Sweat, Christopher Williams and Levert's former mentor Joe Little of the Rude Boys. In 1997, Levert teamed up again with fellow singers Keith Sweat and Johnny Gill, to form the supergroup, LSG. The trio released the album Levert-Sweat-Gill the same year, selling over two million copies; it was followed by LSG2 in 2003. 

In 1999, Levert sang the chorus on the Chris Rock spoken-word comedy piece, "No Sex (In the Champagne Room)". Levert performed a duet with Teena Marie on the latter's 2004 album La Doña. Levert's last collaborations included Jim Brickman on the song "My Angel", for Brickman's 2006 album entitled Escape and on the song "Real S***" from rapper Styles P's album, Time Is Money. Levert was posthumously featured again on former groupmates Keith Sweat's "Knew It All Along" and Johnny Gill from the singer's Til the Morning album, which was released two before days Levert's fifth anniversary of his death. Levert was also posthumously featured on Keith Sweat's track "Let's Go to Bed" from his 2016 studio album Dress to Impress.

Acting career
Levert began his acting career as Charles Young, his first appearance on The Jamie Foxx Show for 2 episodes with "Just Don't Do It", that aired on November 5, 1998 and Jamie disapproves of his mother (Jo Marie Payton) because she decided to marry him in the episode. In January 2001, Gerald appears again in the series finale "Always and Forever" when Jamie (Jamie Foxx) and Fancy (Garcelle Beauvais) got married and sang the opening ceremony at the wedding and joined by fellow singers Gladys Knight and Marilyn McCoo (without her husband Billy Davis Jr.). On November 10, 2003 (exactly three years prior to his death), Levert's final acting role that aired during his life was when he appeared in an episode of The Parkers, He played T's father in the episode and comes for a visit to start a new band

Death
On November 10, 2006, Gerald Levert was found dead in his bed at his house in Cleveland, Ohio. Initial reports stated that Levert had died of an apparent heart attack, but the autopsy report conducted by the Cuyahoga County coroner's office concluded that Levert's death was caused by a fatal combination of prescription narcotics and over-the-counter drugs. The drugs in his bloodstream included the narcotic pain relievers Vicodin, Percocet, and Darvocet, along with anxiety medication Xanax and two over-the-counter antihistamines. The autopsy also revealed that Levert had pneumonia. The official cause of death was acute intoxication, and the death was ruled accidental. Gerald Levert was 40 years old. Following the disclosure of Gerald Levert's cause of death, a family spokesman stated that all the drugs found in Levert's bloodstream were prescribed to the singer. Levert was taking the pain medication because of chronic pain from a lingering shoulder problem and surgery in 2005 to repair a severed Achilles tendon.

Personal life
Gerald Levert dated singer Miki Howard from 1985 to 1989. In 2003, Levert had a relationship with singer Kandi Burruss. They had no children together. Levert had three children: LeMicah, Camryn, and Carlysia.
Carlysia, an aspiring singer, appeared on the MTV series My Super Sweet 16, with her father in 2005. His father is the third cousin of Cleveland Cavaliers basketball star, Caris LeVert.

Shortly before his death, Levert completed work on what would be his final album, In My Songs. The album was released on February 13, 2007. In June 2007, a book Gerald was working to complete entitled, I Got Your Back: A Father and Son Keep it Real About Love, Fatherhood, Family, and Friendship, was released. The book was initially planned as a tie-in for a Levert album of the same name. I Got Your Back explores Gerald and Eddie's father/son relationship, the necessity of male bonding, and importance of repairing fractured families. Levert was also working on a reality show in which he was losing weight along with 12 of his female fans, who were training with him at his palatial home.

Awards and nominations
On December 7, 2006, it was announced that Levert, along with Chaka Khan, Yolanda Adams and Carl Thomas were nominated for a Grammy in the category of Best R&B Performance by a Duo Or Group With Vocals for their collaboration on "Everyday (Family Reunion)", a song from the soundtrack of Tyler Perry's Madea's Family Reunion. He was nominated again for the Best Traditional R&B Vocal Performance for his single, "In My Songs". At the 50th annual Grammy Awards, it was announced that Levert had won the award for "In My Songs". Levert's brother and former founding LeVert member Sean Levert accepted in his late brother's behalf.
On August 17, 2013, in his hometown of Cleveland, Ohio, Gerald Levert was inducted into the 2013 class of the Rhythm and Blues Music Hall of Fame along with the O'Jays.

American Music Award
1999, Favorite R&B/Soul Band, Duo or Group (Nominated) with LSG
1993, Favorite Male R&B/Soul Artist (Nominated)
1988, Favorite R&B/Soul Single: "Casanova" (Nominated) with Levert
BET Awards
2007, Favorite Male R&B Artist: (Nominated)
2007, BET Just Cool Like Dat: (Winner)
Grammy Awards
2008, Best Traditional R&B Performance: "In My Songs" (Winner)
2007, Best R&B Performance by a Duo or Group: "Everyday (Family Reunion)" (Nominated) with Chaka Khan, Carl Thomas & Yolanda Adams
1998, Best R&B Album By A Duo or Group: "Levert Sweat Gill" (Nominated) with LSG
1988, Best R&B Performance by a Duo or Group: "Casanova" (Nominated) with Levert
Image Awards
2004, Outstanding Male Artist (Nominated)
2008, Best Duo or Group (Winner) as Gerald Levert & Eddie Levert
Soul Train Awards
2003, Favorite Male Soul/R&B Album: The G Spot (Nominated)
1999, Favorite Band, Duo or Group Album: Levert.Sweat.Gill (Nominated)
1995, Favorite Male Soul/R&B Album: Groove On (Nominated)
1988, Favorite Band, Duo or Group Single: "Casanova" (Winner) with Levert
1988, Favorite Band, Duo or Group Album: The Big Throwdown (Winner) with Levert

Discography

Studio albums

Compilations albums

Singles

References

External links
Atlantic Records site for Gerald Levert

Gerald Levert - Cleveland Plain Dealer special section
Gerald Levert's Last Interview

1966 births
2006 deaths
African-American singer-songwriters
American soul singers
Atlantic Records artists
Drug-related deaths in Ohio
Grammy Award winners
Musicians from Cleveland
Musicians from Shaker Heights, Ohio
American contemporary R&B singers
Accidental deaths in Ohio
LSG (band) members
20th-century African-American male singers
21st-century African-American male singers
Singer-songwriters from Ohio
New jack swing musicians